Caribe is an American crime drama series that was originally broadcast on Monday nights at 10:00–11:00 pm (ET) on ABC from February 17 until May 12, 1975. The Quinn Martin-produced series was about the exploits of the Caribe Force, a fictional law enforcement unit that had extra-national jurisdiction throughout the Caribbean, headquartered in Miami. The stars were Stacy Keach as Lieutenant Ben Logan, a former officer in Miami Police hired by the Caribe Force, and Carl Franklin as his partner, Sergeant Mark Walters, also formerly of the Miami PD. Originally it was planned that Franklin's character would be a former detective inspector from one of the British Commonwealth island nations in the Caribbean, but the character was ultimately depicted as an American, and as someone who was outranked by Logan, somewhat undercutting both the supposedly international character of the Caribe Force, and the supposedly equal status of the two co-stars.  Robert Mandan played their superior, Deputy Commissioner Ed Rawlings.  The series was plagued by production problems.

Episodes

References

External links

1970s American crime drama television series
1970s American police procedural television series
1975 American television series debuts
1975 American television series endings
American Broadcasting Company original programming
English-language television shows
Television shows set in Miami
Television series by CBS Studios
American detective television series